Liberty Bridge is a four-lane road bridge over Sava River in Zagreb, Croatia. The Većeslav Holjevac Avenue crosses over it, connecting Trnje with Novi Zagreb in the central part of the city.

Bridges in Zagreb
Novi Zagreb
Bridges completed in 1959
Bridges over the Sava in Croatia